River Plantation is an unincorporated community in Montgomery County, Texas. As of 2007 it has 1,200 houses and about 3,000 residents. According to the 2015 American Community Survey, the median household income for residents living in River Plantation and the surrounding area was $84,583.

History
The lower reaches of the community were developed in the late 1960s. An underpass of Interstate 45 opened before April 18, 2007, increasing access to the community.

Flooding Incidents

Due to its proximity to the San Jacinto River and its low elevation, the community of River Plantation is prone to frequent flooding.

In 1994, a deluge of rain across Southeast Texas caused flooding in several communities. Throughout the state, six died from the flooding. In River Plantation, water from the San Jacinto River flooded 110 houses. The Federal Government of the United States bought and razed twenty of them; Gwen Hruska Park is located where the former houses stood.

Major flooding events in 2015 and 2016 caused local officials to issue voluntary evacuations of River Plantation.

Hurricane Harvey in 2017 resulted in severe flooding of the neighborhood, water up to the second story of some homes, and a mandatory evacuation due to record releases from the Lake Conroe dam.

Geography

The subdivision has curving roadways, as opposed to a grid road system.

Education
Residents are within the Conroe Independent School District. They are zoned to Bonnie Wilkinson Elementary School, Oree Bozman Intermediate School, Peet Junior High School, and Conroe High School. Wilkinson was named after a principal in Conroe ISD.

Parks and recreation

Gwen Hruska Park, named after a former president of the homeowner's association, is located in River Plantation. The River Plantation Community Improvement Association (RPCIA) operates and maintains the park and its trails. (linear feet) of concrete trails are located in the park. The Texas Parks and Wildlife Grant Assistant Program funded the trails.

References

External links

Unincorporated communities in Montgomery County, Texas
Greater Houston
Unincorporated communities in Texas